This is the complete filmography of actor Peter Haskell (October 15, 1934 – April 12, 2010).

Film

Television

References

External links
 

Male actor filmographies
American filmographies